The Hour of Reprisal is the second solo studio album by American hip hop musician Ill Bill. It was released on September 16, 2008, via Uncle Howie Records. Featured guests on the album include Howard Jones of Killswitch Engage, Vinnie Paz of Jedi Mind Tricks, H.R. and Darryl Jenifer of Bad Brains, Max Cavalera of Soulfly, Immortal Technique, HERO, Slaine and Everlast of La Coka Nostra, B-Real of Cypress Hill, Raekwon of Wu-Tang Clan, Necro and Tech N9ne. The album was included in DJ Premier's Top 20 Albums of 2008.

Track listing

Personnel

 Ill Bill – vocals, arranging, writing, production, mixing
 Howard Jones – guest vocals
 Vinnie Paz – guest vocals
 H.R. – guest vocals
 Darryl Jenifer – guest bass
 Immortal Technique – guest vocals
 Max Cavalera – guest vocals
 HERO – guest vocals
 Slaine – guest vocals
 B-Real – guest vocals
 Everlast – guest vocals
 Raekwon – guest vocals
 Necro – guest vocals, production, guitar & bass on "The Most Dangerous Weapon Alive"
 Tech N9ne – guest vocals

 Carlos Bess – mixing
Todd Ray - production
DJ Lethal - production
Sicknature - production
DJ Premier - production
DJ Muggs - production
Darp Malone - production
Cynic - production
 Larry Carroll – cover art

Charts

References

2008 albums
Albums produced by DJ Premier
Albums produced by DJ Lethal
Albums produced by DJ Muggs
Fat Beats Records albums
Ill Bill albums